The Register of the Treasury was an officer of the United States Treasury Department. In 1919, the office of the Register became the Public Debt Service which, in 1940, became the Bureau of the Public Debt. The Register's duties included filing the accounting records of the government, transferring and cancelling federal debt securities, and filing the certificates of US-registered ships.

The signature of the Register of the Treasury was found on almost all United States currency until 1923, along with that of the Treasurer of the United States. Four of the five African Americans whose signatures have appeared on U.S. currency were Registers of the Treasury (Blanche K. Bruce, Judson W. Lyons, William T. Vernon and James C. Napier).

After Woodrow Wilson appointed an African-American, Adam E. Patterson, for the position in 1917, Southern Senators (including Hoke Smith, James K. Vardaman, and Ben Tillman) expressed their opposition to Patterson on the grounds of his race, also saying they opposed any African-American for an office that would put them above Caucasian women. Patterson quickly withdrew his name, and Wilson appointed Gabe E. Parker, the first white man to hold the position in fifteen years, to the Register of the Treasury, leaving African-Americans dismayed.

Registers of the Treasury
The Treasury had eighteen Registers between 1861 and 1933.

References

External links

U.S. Treasury - Duties and Functions of the Bureau of the Public Debt (cached)
 

Defunct agencies of the United States government